Andrés Sebastián Robles Fuentes (born 7 May 1994) is a Chilean footballer that currently plays for C.D. Antofagasta in the Chilean Primera División.

International career
After playing the 2011 South American U-17 Championship at Ecuador as captain (where Chile didn’t reach the 2011 FIFA U-17 World Cup qualification), two years later he integrated the U20 squad at the 2013 FIFA U-20 World Cup which they qualified to it after a brilliant South American Youth Championship in Argentina — where he had to overcome a serious knee injury to play it — with Mario Salas as coach.

On 20 April 2014, after being called-up by Jorge Sampaoli to play a friendly match with Brazil days ago, Robles made his full international debut against O Pentacampeão coming on as a substitute in the 90th minute during a 2–2 draw at Belo Horizonte which re-inaugurated the Estádio Mineirão.

Personal life
He is the son of the former Chilean international Héctor Robles.

References

External links
 
 

1994 births
Living people
Chilean footballers
Chilean expatriate footballers
Santiago Wanderers footballers
Atlético Madrid B players
C.D. Huachipato footballers
San Luis de Quillota footballers
Real Garcilaso footballers
Esporte Clube Água Santa players
Universidad de Concepción footballers
C.D. Antofagasta footballers
Chilean Primera División players
Peruvian Primera División players
Primera B de Chile players
Segunda División B players
Chile under-20 international footballers
Association football defenders
Association football midfielders
Chilean expatriate sportspeople in Spain
Chilean expatriate sportspeople in Peru
Chilean expatriate sportspeople in Brazil
Expatriate footballers in Spain
Expatriate footballers in Peru
Expatriate footballers in Brazil